Saccharina is a genus of 24 species of Phaeophyceae (brown algae). It is found in the north Atlantic Ocean and the northern Pacific Ocean at depths from 8 m to 30 m (exceptionally to 120 m in the warmer waters of the Mediterranean Sea and off Brazil).

The commercially important species Saccharina japonica (Laminaria japonica) is cultivated as kombu, a popular food in Japan.

Species
The following is a list of the 24 species of Saccharina:

 Saccharina angustata (Kjellman) C.E. Lane, C. Mayes, Druehl & G.W. Saunders  
Saccharina angustissima (Collins) Augyte, Yarish & Neefus
 Saccharina bongardiana (Postels & Ruprecht) Selivanova, Zhigadlova & G.I. Hansen 
 Saccharina cichorioides (Miyabe) C.E. Lane, C. Mayes, Druehl & G.W. Saunders 
 Saccharina coriacea (Miyabe) C.E. Lane, C. Mayes, Druehl & G.W. Saunders 
Saccharina complanata (Setchell & N.L.Gardner) Gabrielson, Lindstrom & O'Kelly
 Saccharina crassifolia (Postels & Ruprecht) Kuntze 
 Saccharina dentigera (Kjellman) C.E. Lane, C. Mayes, Druehl & G.W. Saunders 
 Saccharina groenlandica (Rosenvinge) C.E. Lane, C. Mayes, Druehl & G.W. Saunders 
 Saccharina gurjanovae (A.D. Zinova) Selivanova, Zhigadlova & G.I. Hansen 
 Saccharina gyrata (Kjellman) C.E. Lane, C. Mayes, Druehl & G.W. Saunders 
 Saccharina japonica (J.E. Areschoug) C.E. Lane, C. Mayes, Druehl & G.W. Saunders 
 Saccharina kurilensis C.E. Lane, C. Mayes, Druehl & G.W. Saunders 
Saccharina lanciformis (Petrov) N.G.Klockova & Beliyi
 Saccharina latissima (Linnaeus) C.E. Lane, C. Mayes, Druehl & G.W. Saunders 
 Saccharina longicruris (Bachelot de la Pylaie) Kuntze 
 Saccharina longipedales (Okamura) C.E. Lane, C. Maves, Druehl & G.W. Saunders 
 Saccharina longissima (Miyabe) C.E. Lane, C. Mayes, Druehl & G.W. Saunders 
 Saccharina ochotensis (Miyabe) C.E. Lane, C. Mayes, Druehl & G.W. Saunders 
 Saccharina religiosa (Miyabe) C.E. Lane, C. Mayes, Druehl & G.W. Saunders 
Saccharina sachalinensis (Miyabe) N.Yotsukura & L.D.Druehl
 Saccharina sculpera (Miyabe) C.E. Lane, C. Mayes, Druehl & G.W. Saunders 
 Saccharina sessilis (C. Agardh) Kuntze 
 Saccharina yendoana (Miyabe) C.E. Lane, C. Mayes, Druehl & G.W. Saunders

References

External links

Laminariaceae
Laminariales genera
Taxa named by John Stackhouse